The Russo-Circassian War (1763–1864; also known as the Russian Invasion of Circassia) was the invasion of Circassia by Russia, starting in July 17, 1763 (O.S) with the Russian Empire assuming authority in Circassia, followed by the Circassian refusal, and ending 101 years later with the last army of Circassia defeated on 21 May 1864 (O.S), making it exhausting and casualty-heavy for both sides. The Circassians fought the Russians longer than all the other peoples of the Caucasus, and the Russo-Circassian War was the longest war both Russia and Circassia have ever fought.

During and after the war, the Russian Empire employed a genocidal strategy of systematically massacring civilians which resulted in the Circassian genocide where up to 2,000,000 Circassians (85-97% of the total population) were either killed or expelled to the Ottoman Empire (especially to modern-day Turkey; see Circassians in Turkey), creating the Circassian diaspora. While the war was initially an isolated conflict, Russian expansion through the entire region soon drew a number of other nations in the Caucasus into the conflict. As such, the war is often considered the western half of the Caucasus War.

During the war, the Russian Empire did not recognize Circassia as an independent region, and as a result, it considered Circassia Russian land which was under rebel occupation, despite the fact that the region was not and had never been under Russian control. Russian generals did not refer to the Circassians by their ethnic name, instead, they called the Circassians "mountaineers", “bandits", and "mountain scum". The war has been subjected to historical revisionism and it has also garnered controversy due to the fact that later Russian sources mostly ignored or belittled the conflict, and Russian state media and officials have gone as far as to claim that the conflict "never happened” and they have also claimed that Circassia "voluntarily joined Russia in the 16th century".

Before the war
Circassians, Christianised through Byzantine influence between the 5th and 6th centuries, were generally in alliance with Georgians and both Georgians and Circassians wanted to keep good relations with the Russians. In 1557, Temryuk Idar of Eastern Circassia allied the Russian Tsar Ivan the Terrible and built a defense against possible enemies. Circassians were Christians during this period and Islam had not begun to spread. In 1561, Ivan the Terrible married Goshenay, daughter of Temryuk, and named her Mariya. Because of his alliance with Russia, in several narratives, Temryuk was described as a tyrant who only cared about his rule.

Although there had previously been a small Muslim presence in Circassia, significant conversions came after 1717, when Sultan Murad IV ordered the Crimeans to spread Islam among the Circassians. Islam gained much more ground later as conversion came to be used to cement defensive alliances to protect their independence against Russian expansion. Despite this, there were still Pagans and Christians among the Circassian people. The Circassian-Russian alliance was damaged and eventually broken when the Circassians converted to Islam and adopted a more pro-Ottoman policy.

On 13 May 1711, Tsar Peter I ordered Araksin, Governor of Astrakhan, to pillage Circassia. Araksin moved with 30,000 strong Russian armed forces and, on 26 August 1711, broke into the lands of the Circassians, and captured Kopyl town (now Slavianski). From there, heading towards the Black Sea, he seized ports on the Kuban and looted and pillaged them. Then, he marched up along the Kuban River, pillaging villages. During this single invasion in Circassia, the Russians killed 43,247 Circassian men and women, and drove away 39,200 horses, 190,000 cattle and 227,000 sheep from Circassia. Russia kept waging this type of warfare against Circassia during the period from 1711 to 1763, but this type of operations were not in order to annex Circassia, but rather raid it. Although Peter I was unable to annex Circassia in his lifetime, he laid the political and ideological foundation for the occupation to take place.

The confrontation of Prince Temryuk against the Ingush 

After the Mongols and Timur, the Ingush began to develop their foothill plains in the 15th-16th centuries. “In the XIII-XIV centuries. complex processes are taking place on the plain and in the foothills of the North Caucasus: long and unprecedentedly cruel wars, on the flat part of Ingushetia such nomads and semi-nomads as the Golden Horde, Timur's hordes, Kalmyks, Nogais, Kumyks and Adygs alternately replaced each other. The Ingush were partially exterminated, partially driven into the mountains. However, all these years they did not abandon their attempts to return to the plain. The Ingush got this opportunity in the 15th-16th centuries.

This campaign was directed against the Ingush societies that left the mountains after the departure of Timur the Lame and mastered their foothill plane from the beginning of the 15th century.

In 1562, the Kabardian prince Temryuk Idarovich undertook an aggressive campaign against the Ingush, who lived in anticipation. Detachments of Nogai Murzas come to his aid. The Russian Tsar Ivan IV the Terrible, married to Temryuk's daughter Maria, sent 1,000 Cossacks under the command of Grigory Pleshcheev to help him. As a result of this unification of the Kabardino-Nogai-Cossack campaign for discovery, 164 settlements were defeated, judging by the Russian chronicles. The Ingush went to the mountains again. Kabardians settled on their former territory.

Political reasons of the war 
Circassia was a key strategic location amidst the power struggle between the emerging Russian Empire, established England and France, and the failing Ottoman Empire. Russia set her sights on expansion along the Black Sea, and England sought to reduce Russia's ability to take advantage of the declining Ottoman Empire, known as the Eastern Question.

To facilitate the fall of Persia, Russia would require shipyards on the Black Sea, which made Circassia, with its coastline, a target. The Circassian territories were particularly attractive to the Russians due to their fertile valleys, and by 1853 the Black Sea had become very important for Russian trade, being responsible for a third of its exports.

Starting date of the war 
The date of the outbreak of the Russian-Circassian War has been a matter of debate by historians. Most scholars agree that organised warfare happened after 1763 when Russia established forts in Circassian territory, but small-scale conflicts have been going on since 1711. Another view held by a smaller number of scholars is that proper warfare began in 1817 with the arrival of Aleksey Yermolov, and prior to that it was merely clashes.

The conflict

Pre-1817 period 
During the reign of Catherine II the Russian army started entering Circassian soil and Russia started building forts in an attempt to quickly annex Circassia. In July 17 (O.S.), 1763, Russian forces entered the town of Mezdeug (modern-day Mozdok) in Eastern Circassia, turning it into a Russian fortress. Thus began the first hostilities between the Circassians and the Russian Empire.

While some Kabardian (Eastern Circassian) nobles wanted to fight the Russians, arguing they could convince the Ottomans and Crimea to help them, other nobles wanted to avoid fighting with Russia and try to make peace.

In January 1764, several Kabardian nobles including Atajuq Misost Bematiqwa met with the representative of the Russian Kizlyar commandant N. A. Potapov and unsuccessfully demanded the demolition of the Mozdok fortress built by the Russians. If the Russian government refused, the Kabardian princes threatened to seek alliance with the Crimean Khan against Russia.

Also in 1764, Kabardian Circassian knights Keysin Keytiqo and Kundeyt Shebez-Giray also met with Catherine II in St. Petersburg. They informed her that "the military build-up in Mezdeug was unacceptable, the region has been a land of Circassians, the situation would create hostility and conflict". She refused diplomacy and the envoys were sent back. On 21 August 1765, the citizens of Circassia were instructed by Russian General De-Medem to accept Russian control or face the Russian army.  In 1765, Kabardian Circassians occupied the fortress of Kizlyar.

In June 1767, Misost Bematiqwa started a military operation against Russia, but many other Kabardian nobles did not want a war and wanted to surrender. In the middle of 1768, fifteen of these Kabardian princes who decided to surrender reported to Kizlyar that they were ready to "take an oath" of allegiance to Russia. Misost Bematiqwa, not wanting to surrender or convert to Christianity, refused.

Bematiqwa's resistance was strengthened when on October 18, 1768, the Ottoman sultan, who had declared war on Russia, sent a letter to Bematiqwa stating that he, as caliph, orders that all the Muslim peoples of the Caucasus should officially rise to war with Russia, obey the Crimean Khan as their commander, and together with the Nogais, defeat Russia. In December 1768, Muhammad-aga, the personal envoy of the Crimean Khan, arrived in Kabarda. The Crimean Khan asked the Kabardian princes to help the Kuban serasker in the upcoming campaign to Russia. In January 1769, the Kizlyar commandant, Major General N. A. Potapov, sent a letter to Bematiqwa putting pressure on him to stop listening to the Ottoman caliph and surrender.

In the same year, Russian army fought a battle against the Kabardian Circassians with the support of the Kalmyk Khan's 20,000 cavalrymen, and were victorious as they destroyed the whole Kabardian army. Another great battle took place in the Nartsane area in June 1769, when a large Russian army entered Kabardia and took up positions near the Pashtu mountains. Circassian forces under the leadership of Misost Bematiqwa retreated as both sides suffered losses.

At this point, the anti-Russian group, which refused to cooperate with the Russian tsarist government, was headed by Bematiqwa. He and his supporters moved to the upper reaches of the Kumy river. Bematiqwa and his associates, in need of allies, turned to the Crimean Khan Devlet Giray for help. The Khan promised to send a small detachment, however, before that happened, the Russian lieutenant general Johann de Medem sent detachments of Cossacks and Kalmyk cavalry against the Kabardians. In an unequal battle on the river Eshkokon, the superior Russian forces defeated the Kabardians.

As a result of the Russo-Turkish War (1768–1774), the Ottomans had forces in Circassia. They were seen as fellow Muslim allies by the Circassians. The Cossacks defended the village of Naur against 8000 men strong Circassian-Turkish combined army.

The Circassian Revolution began in 1770.

In 1771, Circassians under the command of Soqur Qaramirza burned many Cossack and Russian barracks.

A battle took near the Malka River on 29 September 1771. The Russians under General Yakobi won the battle.

In 1772 a serious collision took place. In the fort Kizlar of the Russian army there were 10,000 soldiers. The battle occurred on Daghestan territory. Both sides suffered serious losses as finally the Russians emerged victorious.

In the same year, 1772, the Kabardian princes sent another embassy to the Crimean Khan Devlet-Girey, calling him to assist them in the inevitable war against tsarist Russia. However, in June 1774, despite nominally being allies, the Crimean Khanate attacked Circassia. A large Crimean army led by Khan Devlet-Girey and Kalga Shabaz-Girey attacked Kabarda and the Battle of Beshtamak took place. The Crimean horde entered Mozdok and hit the nearby villages, which were occupied and ruined by them.

The Ottoman Empire lost its protection over the Crimean Khanate with the 1774 Treaty of Küçük Kaynarca. Following these events, Russian presence in the region got stronger, and the Circassians requested help and alliance from the Ottomans.

In 1776 the Russian army built several forts in Terek to encircle the Kabardian Circassians from the north. The Circassians managed to gather a 14,000 strong army and won back several forts. From 1777 the Russians built a line of forts from Mozdok northwest to Azov. The presence of Cossacks in former grazing lands slowly converted traditional raiding from a kind of ritualized sport into a serious military struggle. In 1778, a battle took place between the Russian troops under the command of Colonel Kulbakov and the Circassians.

In 1779 general Yakobi conducted an offensive in Kabarda, which lasted all summer. The Circassian region of Kabardia, near the Balka River, was attacked on 29 September 1779, and was occupied with the loss of the Kabardian defenders as well as 2,000 horses, 5,000 cattle and 5,000 sheep. About 50 tribal elites died in this conflict.

On October 10, 1779, the principalities of Chemguy, Besleney, and Kabarda coordinated an offensive together. The leaders were Misostiqo Bat and Qownshayiqo Adildjeri. As a result, Russian armies temporarily withdrew from Circassia.

In 1781, the Ottomans, in Circassia, built a strong fortress in order to ensure Turkish influence in Circassia and as a base for future operations against Russia in the Kuban and the Don, as well as in the Crimea.

In 1782, Ferah Ali Pasha arrived in the Soghujaq Castle in Western Circassia as a missionary and diplomat from the Ottoman Empire with the aim of Islamizing some Circassians who were still not Muslims.

The position of the Kabardians became even more precarious when Russia occupied the Kuban in 1781 and annexed the Crimea in 1783. Many Tatars, the erstwhile enemies, took refuge in Circassia. Sensing the threat posed by Russia, the Circassians and Nogais launched joint attacks on the Russians in the Western Caucasus in 1784, but no success was achieved.

Between 1783 and 1785, Russian forces led by General Potyomkin attacked the Kabardia region.

In 1784, Sheikh Mansur, an imam in Chechnya who wanted to unite all Caucasian peoples against Russia, declared holy war against Russia. Angered, the Russian troops plundered and burned his village to the ground. Soon, Chechen fighters won the Battle of the Sunja.

In 1786, Russian forces abandoned the new fort of Vladikavkaz, and did not occupy it again until 1803. From 1787 to 1791, during the Russian-Turkish War, Sheikh Mansur moved to Circassia, and started Western Circassian resistance against Russia. He led the Circassians in assaults against Russian forces.

The Russian army entered Circassia again after the Battle of Jilehoy and raided the Abaza, Besleney, Chemguy and Hatuqway regions in 1787, successfully defeated the regional Circassian armies and burned near a hundred villages. In 1788, the Russians besieged the Bighurqal (Anapa) castle, but failed.

In 1787, Circassian envoys led by Tatarkhan Kurighoqo and Sidak Jankat requested a meeting with the Russians to secure a solution, but they were denied. The Russians sent the envoys back.

In 1790, a large Russian army led by General Yury Bogdanovich Bibikov crossed the Kuban river and entered the territory of Western Circassia. Bibikov managed to reach Anapa, but failed to capture the castle. He also suffered heavy losses during his retreat. After this defeat, Bibikov was removed from his post and Circassian attacks on Russian forts increased significantly. At the same year, Russian armies entered the Bzhedugh region and burnt several villages.

The Russians introduced courts in Kabarda in the early 1790s and declared that the Adyghe Xabze, the Circassian law, has been removed. This greatly angered the Circassians.

On May 29 (O.S.), 1791, Russian troops led by Ivan Gudovich crossed the Kuban and entered Circassia to capture the Anapa castle. The Russian camp was established and in June.

Following this, the Siege of Anapa took place, and the Anapa castle was taken by the Russians. Once the Russian army entered the fortress, as per Gudovich's orders, the Anapa fort were razed to the ground, wells were poisoned and houses were burned. The entire fort was destroyed. On July 10, Russian troops left Anapa. Sheikh Mansur was captured in the fort and  brought to Saint Petersburg and imprisoned for life in harsh conditions. In April 1794, he died, reportedly due to poor treatment.

After a large influx of Cossack settlers and the construction of a long line of pickets in 1792 which cut the Circassians off from their traditional pastures around the Kuban river the Circassians began systematically raiding Russian encampments and then disappearing.

At the same time, as more Russian troops came to be stationed in the region, they started to raid native villages, further enraging the natives and producing cycles of retaliation.

The Russian military tried to impose authority by building a series of forts, but these forts in turn became the new targets of raids and indeed sometimes the highlanders actually captured and held the forts.

In 1799, Russian general Fyodor Bursak organized several raids against the Western Circassians, and personally ordered his men to burn Circassian villages, even those who were loyal to the Russian Empire.

In 1800, as part of the Russian conquest of the Caucasus, Russia annexed eastern Georgia and by 1806 held Transcaucasia from the Black Sea to the Caspian. Russia had to hold the Georgian Military Highway in the center so the war against the mountaineers was divided into eastern and western parts. With Georgia out of the question, more armies were directed to Circassia. Russian armies successfully crossed the Kuban River again in March 1814. Western Circassians used this opportunity to promote the young prince Jembulat Bolotoqo and sent a delegation to the Ottoman Empire, who complained against the Russian actions.

On 22 February 1802, near the Karakuban island, Western Circassians captured a Russian ship in the Black Sea and burned it down. During the battle, 2 Russian admirals and 14 Cossacks soldiers were killed, the rest surrendered, were pardoned by the Circassians and left.

In 1804, the Kabardian Circassians and neighbouring Abazins, Ossetians and Chechens united in a military movement. They aimed to destroy the Kislovodsk Russian fort. Despite threats of bloodshed from General Tsitsianov, the forces began threatening the Kislovodsk fort. 

Russian forces commanded by General Glazenap were pushed back to Georgievsk and then put under siege, however the attacking Kabardian forces were eventually pushed back, and 80 Kabardian villages were burnt as a reprisal.

In 1805, a plague struck Kabardia. Using this as an excuse, General Glazenap ordered his forces to burn down 80 villages to terrorize the people into submission and to wreak revenge upon the Kabardians. In 1810 about 200 villages were burned. In 1817 the frontier was pushed to the Sunzha River and in 1822 a line of forts was built from Vladikavkaz northwest through Nalchik to the Pyatigorsk area. After 1825 fighting subsided. Between 1805 and 1807, Bulgakov's army burned more than 280 villages. The population of Kabarda, which was 350,000 in 1763, was only 37,000 in 1817.

In 1807, the fortress of Anapa in Western Circassia was captured by Russian troops and Circassian nobleman Seferbiy Zaneqo was taken as hostage.

In 1808, a Russian commission from decided that in order to end Circassian resistance against the Russian Empire, the Circassians would need to be eliminated from their homeland.

In January 1810, Circassians raided and plundered the Cossack settlements of Ivanovskaya and Stebliyevkaya. At the Olginsk Fortress, they killed 146 Cossacks, including the fortress commander Colonel Tikhovski. During these operations, the Circassian army suffered around 500 casualties.

In February same year, Fyodor Bursak's forces entered a Circassian village near the Sop River and proceeded to kill every single inhabitant. They decided to postpone their plans to attack the next village when the river began to overflow. In December, the same methods were applied in the Shapsug region, and several villages were burnt. After some civilians deserted to the forests, forests in the region were burnt down.

In 1811, petitions were sent to St. Petersburg in Russia, appealing for the basic rights of Circassians in the occupied areas.

Post-1817 period

Russian conquest of Kabarda 
 In 1817, Russian veteran general Aleksey Yermolov arrived in the Caucasus. Deciding that Circassians would not surrender, General Yermolov concluded that "terror" would be effective. Russia began to destroy Circassian fortresses, villages and towns and slaughter the people.

In May 1818, the village of Tram was surrounded, burnt, and its inhabitants killed by Russian forces under the command of General Ivan Petrovich Delpotso, who took orders from Yermolov and who then wrote to the rebel forces:

The Russians also constructed several more fortifications during that year. During the whole period from 1779 to 1818, 315,000 of the 350,000 Kabardian Circassians had reportedly been killed by the Russian armies.

These brutal methods annoyed the Circassians even more, and many Circassian nobles, even those who had been in blood feuds for centuries, joined hands to resist harder, many Russian armies were defeated, some completely destroyed. In Europe, especially in England, great sympathy for the Circassians who resisted the Russians was starting to form.

In response to persistent Circassian resistance and the failure of their previous policy of building forts, the Russian military began using a strategy of disproportionate retribution for raids. With the goal of imposing stability and authority beyond their current line of control and over the whole Caucasus, Russian troops retaliated by destroying villages or any place that resistance fighters were thought to hide, as well as employing assassinations and executions of whole families.

Understanding that the resistance was reliant on being fed by sympathetic villages, the Russian military also systematically destroyed crops and livestock. These tactics further enraged natives and intensified resistance to Russian rule. The Russians began to counter this by modifying the terrain, in both the environment and the demographics. They cleared forests by roads, destroyed native villages, and often settled new farming communities of Russians or pro-Russian Orthodox peoples.

The complete destruction of villages with everyone and everything within them became a standard action by the Russian army and Cossack units, marking the beginning of the Circassian genocide. Nevertheless, the Circassian resistance continued. Villages that had previously accepted Russian rule were found resisting again, much to the ire of Russian commanders.

In September 1820, Russian forces began to forcibly resettle inhabitants of Eastern Circassia. Throughout the conflict, Russia had employed a tactic of divide and rule, and following this, the Russians began to encourage the Karachay-Balkar tribes, who had previously been subjugated by the Circassians, to rise up and join the Russian efforts. Military forces were sent into Kabardia, killing cattle and causing large numbers of inhabitants to flee into the mountains, with the land these inhabitants had once lived on being acquired for the Kuban Cossacks. The entirety of Kabardia (Eastern Circassia) was then declared property of the Russian government.

General Yermolov accelerated his efforts in Kabardia, with the month of March 1822 alone seeing fourteen villages being displaced as Yermolov led expeditions. The construction of new defensive lines in Kabardia led to renewed uprisings, which were eventually crushed and the rebellious lords had their much needed peasant work forces freed by the Russian forces in order to discourage further uprisings. The area was placed under Russian military rule in 1822, as Kabardia eventually fully fell.

Invasion of Western Circassia 

While Eastern Circassia was being occupied, Russia was also engaged in a war with the Turks (Russo-Turkish War of 1806–1812) in order to free the Black Sea from Turkish influence, and sporadic wars had also flared up with other neighbours. In western Circassia, which Russia had previously been merely foraying into, a number of tribes were dominant; the Besleneys, Abadzekhs, Ubykhs, Shapsughs, Hatuqwai and Natukhaj, portrayed by Russian propaganda as savages in a possible attempt to curry favour from the international community. Russian and Circassian forces clashed repeatedly, particularly on the Kuban plains, where cavalry from both sides could manoeuvre freely.

Trade with Circassia could not be prevented, however, and both the Turkish and the English supplied Circassia with firearms and ammunition with which to fight the Russians. England also supplied several advisors, while Turkey attempted to persuade Circassia to start a Holy War (Jihad), which would draw support from other nations.

In only one year, 1830, arrived up to 200 Turkish and British ships delivering military aid to the shores of Circassia.

Rise of Jembulat Boletoqo 

Meanwhile, Circassian commander, Jembulat Boletoqo, was leading his cavalry force into Russian territory. Only one Cossack regiment decided to fight the rising Circassian army on 23 October at the village of Sabl on the Barsukly River. Jembulat's forces surrounded the Cossacks and killed all of them in a saber attack.

In April 1823, Boletoqo and his forces along with Circassian lord Skhum's army attacked the Russian line. Lord Skhum was wounded in the cheek by a spear on each side and by a bullet around the spine. The Russians withdrew and left more than 20 prisoners to the Circassians. In May of the same year, the Circassians burned a large Russian fortress in Kruglolesskoe.

In 1823, Under the leadership of Boletoqo, Circassian cavalry headed for Russian camps. Half of the detachment consisted of Kabardians who fled Kabardia to continue fighting. Multiple Cossack armies were defeated by this detachment. Later in 1823, 30 Circassian regional leaders gathered in the village of Boletoqo behind the Belaya River. A plan was made to re-take Kabardia from the Russians. In 1832, Boletoqo tried to implement this plan, but failed.

In February 1824, the Russian army led by General Vlasov attacked the Circassian villages of Jambut, Aslan, Morza, and Tsab Dadhika and completely destroyed them, along with the inhabitants, despite the villages being loyal to the Russian Empire.

In the summer of 1825, Russian forces carried out several military operations. In 18 August, a group of Russian officers commanded by General Veliaminov burned the residency of Hajji Tlam, one of the elderly supporters of the Circassian resistance in Abadzekh, and killed his entire family. The village was alarmed and Circassian men and women took up arms and attacked the Russian soldiers who caused the killing. Before the Russians had time to retreat, they were completely destroyed by the attack from the Circassians.

In 31 January, Jembulat burned down the fortress of Marevskoye as revenge. On 4 June 1828, Jembulat Boletoqo started his campaign into Russian lands with 2,000 cavalry under five flags of different Circassian principalities, as well as a Turkish flag as a symbol of their loyalty to Islam.

The Russians concluded that he intended to go to Kabarda in the middle of the Russian-Turkish war, and open a second front on the Terek and Sunja Rivers. Earl Paskevich ordered the 2nd Ulan division, returning from the Russia-Iran war, to move along the Georgian Military Road to cut off the route of the Circassians toward Kabarda. The 40th Eger battalion marched from Kabarda toward Jembulat. Yet, Jembulat suddenly changed his direction and headed toward the town of Georgievsk, the Russian administrative center in the Caucasus. The Circassian army stopped on a high hill at a distance from the Marinskaya fortress. Jembulat menaced the Volzhskiy regiment's left flank with all his forces, and won the battle.

Political analyst Khan-Giray observed that the situation changed for Great-Prince Jembulat “after the field marshal Paskevich left the region”. The new commander-in-chief, Baron Rosen, did not believe in human rights of the indigenous Circassians.

In 1827, Ismail Berzeg officially declared the military confederation of the Circassian tribes. By the end of 1839, he managed to unite a significant part of the population under his control.

In May 1828, Russian General Emmanuel raided all the way to inner parts of Circassia, plundering many villages. The Karachay-Balkars surrendered to General Emmanuel without any conflict or loss.

The Russians besieged Anapa in 1828. The Ottomans sought help from Circassians and the war lasted for two months and Osman Pasha, the Turkish commander of Anapa, had decided to surrender the fort, and Seferbiy himself led the negotiations to avoid potential bloodshed but was taken prisoner by the Russians. General Emanuel, a Russian general, then razed 6 Natukhay villages and many Shapsugh villages. He then passed the Kuban and burned 210 more villages.

In 1828, Aytech Qanoqo, a Circassian prince who lost his status in the Circassian Revolution, arrived at the Russian camp, where he took an oath of allegiance to the Russian Empire, changed his name to Aytek Konokov, converted to Christianity, took promise that his village would not be destroyed like the other Circassian villages, and accepted Russian citizenship. However, after seeing the failure of the Russian forces to quickly annex Circassia, he changed sides and turned to Islam again and started to fight for Circassia.

Treaty of Adrianople 

The Treaty of Adrianople was signed on 14 September 1829. According to the document, Circassia was given by the Ottoman Empire to Russia. Circassia was not a part of the Ottoman Empire, so it was not clear how this happened, and many, including German economist Karl Marx, criticised this event.

In 1830, an emergency council, attended by representatives from all over Circassia, convened to discuss the treaty. Most Circassian leaders believed the treaty was a hoax, not the real one, as they believed that the Ottoman Empire would never abandon the Circassians. And it was decided to send a delegation to the Ottoman sultan to examine the accuracy of the news.

Seferbiy Zaneqo, Nour Mohammad Haghur, and Tram were selected as delegates. They hoped to meet with the Ottoman caliph to ask the matter and receive a blessing. When they arrived, the Russian ambassador demanded their arrest. Following this, Zaneqo hid while the other two delegates returned to Circassia. After confirming that it is in fact the real treaty, the Circassians considered it invalid, arguing that because their territory had been independent of the Ottomans, Istanbul had no right to cede it. Circassian ambassadors were sent to England, France and Ottoman lands announcing that they deny this treaty under all conditions.

Zaneqo offered the Russians a white peace in which Circassia would remain independent and Russia would leave the region. The Russians wanted the Circassians to surrender unconditionally, but the Circassian stance was clear:

Before 1830 Russia maintained a siege line along the Kuban River. There was constant raiding by both sides but no change in borders. In the late 1830s Russia gained increasing control of the coast. This slowed down after in 1834, the Circassian army under the command of Kizbech Tughuzhuqo defeated the Russian army of 12,000 men.

In early January 1831, Sefebiy Zaneqo organized several general meetings with Circassian leaders. Among other things, he put forward the idea of a possible reconciliation between the Circassians and Russia, on the stipulation that the Russians retreated behind the Kuban, however, this proposal was rejected.

In 1831, the Russian government considered the destruction of the Natukhaj tribe in favor of populating their land on the northern coast of the Black Sea with Cossacks. In late 1831, in retaliation for Circassian attacks against Cossack military bases, Russian General Frolov and his task force destroyed several villages. Beginning the night of November 20, a "horror campaign" was started, in which villages were surrounded by artillery weapons and shot at. The targets were local homes, as well as mosques. The operation was described in a report:

In another report, General Rosen described how, in December 1831, 381 Circassians were captured by his forces and boasted about taking them prisoner and firing at villages, leaving 100 men and 50 women dead. He goes on to detail how when setting fire to a village, a Russian soldier named Midvideiv killed a Circassian who tried to stop him from burning down a mosque.

General Zass takes control 

In 1833, Colonel Grigory Zass was appointed commander of a part of the Kuban Military Line with headquarters in the Batalpashinsk fortress. Colonel Zass received wide authority to act as he saw fit. He was a racist who considered Circassians to be an inferior race than Russians and other Europeans. The only way to deal with the Circassians, in his opinion, was to scare them away "just like wild animals." Zass advocated ruthless military methods predicated on this notion, including burning people alive, cutting off heads for enjoyment, burning populated villages to the ground, spreading epidemics on purpose, and mass rape of children. He kept a box under his bed with his collection of severed Circassian body parts.

Colonel Grigory Zass was a key figure in the Circassian genocide through ethnic cleansing. He operated on all areas of Circassia, but East Circassia was effected the most. It is estimated 70% of the East Circassian population died in the process.

In August 1833, Zass led his first expedition into Circassian territory, destroying as many villages and towns as possible. This was followed by a series of other expeditions. He attacked the Besleney region between November and December, destroying most villages, including the village of the double agent Aytech Qanoqo. He continued to exterminate the Circassian population between 1834 and 1835, particularly in the Abdzakh, Besleney, Shapsug, and Kabardian regions.

In 1834, Zass sent a report to Rosen detailing his campaign into Circassia:

He talks about how he killed three Circassian civilians on their way to fetch grass:

He then talks about how he destroyed a neighborhood:

Zass' main strategy was to intercept and retain the initiative, terrorize the Circassians, and destroy Circassian settlements. After a victory, he would usually burn several villages and seize cattle and horses to show off, acts which he proudly admitted. He paid close attention to the enemy's morale. In his reports, he frequently boasted about the destruction of villages and glorified the mass murder of civilians.

In the end of 1836, the Armenians of Circassia declared their allegiance for Russia and begged Zass to locate them a place to live. In 1839, Zass established an Armenian colony in the region that had previously belonged to the Circassians. To make room for the Armenians, Circassian villages and the people who lived in them were destroyed. This year is regarded the official year of Armavir's establishment.

In October 1836, General Zass sent Jembulat Boletoqo word that he would like to make peace. This was a strategy, if Boletoqo came to the Russian fortress for explanation, he would be assassinated; in case he did not come, the Russians would claim that he was a warmonger.

Prince Boletoqo came to Zass’ residency. The general was not there for his first visit, but Zass told him to come at an exact date when he would certainly be in his residency. On his way to the Prochnyi Okop fortress, Great Prince Jembulat was killed by a Russian sniper who was hiding in the forest on the Russian bank of the Kuban River at the intersection with the Urup River.

In 1838, Zass spread false rumors about his serious illness, then staged his own death, weakening the Circassians' vigilance. On the same night, when the Circassians were celebrating their oppressor's death, the suddenly "resurrected" Zass launched a raid that destroyed two villages. He left the Caucasus in 1842.

Mission of the Vixen 
British adventurer James Stanislaus Bell arrived in Circassia by 1836, in order to provide military aid and medical relief to the Circassians. In November 1836 the Russian military brig Ajax detained his ship, in the port of Sujuk-Qale (now Novorossiysk). At the time of detention, 8 guns, 800 pounds of gunpowder, and a significant number of weapons had already been unloaded from its side. Bell was allowed to leave as he falsely introduced himself as a diplomat, but the ship and the cargo were confiscated in favor of the Russian government and included in the Russian Black Sea fleet.

Left without a ship, Bell remained in Circassia. He did not lose time and helped the Circassians in military affairs. By 1840, with the support of Polish deserters and Circassians trained by Bell, there were several attacks on Russian forts on the Black Sea and Gelendzhik cordon lines. The Circassians employed military tactics taught to them by Bell, such as taking fortifications by storm, and using artillery.

Naval and shore battles 
In May 1834, the Circassians launched a naval landing near Bombory, thus the fighting was carried over to the sea.

In October 1836, a naval battle was fought as Russian warship "Nartsiss" was attacked by 7 Circassian galleys. Russian captain Varnitskiy reported in his report that the Circassians fought in an organized manner, and that the Russians escaped at the last moment as a result of the fierce collision.

In 1835 and 1836, Circassian armies led by Ismail Berzeg engaged on several operations.

By this time, Aytech Qanoqo had reformed his army and organized a campaign, but failed. After this failure, he saw little hope left for Circassia and switched to the Russian side again.

In 1837, Kizbech Tughuzhuqo attacked the right bank of the Kuban Russian fort. The Russians wanted to end the war already, and wanted to try another strategy. On April 13, 1838, Russian forces engaged the Circassian army in the estuary of River Sochi, and on May 12, 1838, the Russians landed at Tuapse with a naval invasion. The majority of engagements during this part of the conflict took place in the form of either amphibious landings on coastal towns in accordance with the directive laid out by the Tsar to secure possible ports, or by routing out Circassian forces entrenched in mountain strongholds. At Tuapse, the Russian landing had begun at 10:00 in the morning, and the Circassians were not beaten back from their positions until 5:00 in the afternoon, with the Russians suffering heavy casualties. On the following day, May 13, when arriving to request permission to remove their dead from the battlefield, a few Circassians leaders were killed.

In 1837, some Circassian leaders offered the Russians a white peace, arguing that no more blood should be shed. In response to this offer, the Russian army under the command of General Yermolov burnt 36 Circassian villages.

In February 1838, there was a fierce collision between 4 Circassian galleys and a Russian ship. The Russians ship was destroyed.

In 1839, Russian forces landed at Subashi and began construction of a fort, where they faced charges by Ubykh forces who were eventually driven back by shellfire from the Russian navy. Over 1000 soldiers then charged the Russian positions, however they were outflanked and overrun as they attempted to retreat. This pattern of attack by the Russian forces went on for several years. Qerzech Shirikhuqo played a big role in reforming and leading the Circassian armies at this time.

Later in 1839, the Circassians declared Bighuqal (Anapa) as their new capital and Hawduqo Mansur was declared the leader of the Circassian Confederation. Thus, all tribes of Circassia were nominally united.

In 1840, Hawduqo Mansur gave a speech addressing Circassian nation:

The Siege of Lazarevsky took place on the night of February 7, 1840. After a 3-hour battle, the fortification was taken by the Circassians. The fort was then destroyed by Circassians, who did not want hostile elements in their land. Hawduqo mansur and Ismail Berzeg went on to capture two more forts with an army of 11,000 men.

In 1841, Circassian commander Ismail Berzeg participated in negotiations with the Russian military leaders in Sochi, but the negotiations ended in vain. The Russian leaders stated that the Circassians were "poor villagers waiting for help from the English". A Russian officer, Lorer, who witnessed Ismail Berzeg's meeting with the Russians, later wrote in his memoirs that Berzeg answered:

In March 1842, the Russians attacked the villages on the plains. Thereupon, Circassians from Abdzakh, Shapsug, Ubykh, Hatuqway, Yegeruqway, Chemguy and Besleney living in the mountains came down from the mountains to help the Circassians who were exposed to Russian attacks on the plains. In front of the Ferz river, the army of the Russian commander Zass retreated with heavy losses.

In October 1842, in Hamish, the Russian-Georgian cavalry of 18,000 men was attacked by the regional Circassian army consisting of 5,000 men. The Circassians applied guerilla warfare while chanting verses from the Quran in order to distract the enemy and increase morale. Russian cavalry, confused and unprepared, was caught off guard as 3,500 Russian soldiers were killed. The remaining Russian forces retreated into Russian ships on the shore, as well as the Scotcha fortress.

In 1844, Aytech Qanoqo again switched sides, and joined Circassia against the Russian forces. On the night of August 26, he tried to siege the fortress of Grigory Zass, ultimately seeking revenge for his destroyed village, but failed. In September 26, he was killed in a battle against the Russians. Some sources claim he was going to the Russian camp in order to change sides again but was attacked by the Russians. His body, contrary to tradition, was not removed by the Circassians from the battlefield for janazah and went to the Russians.

First two naibs 

Imam Shamil, the leader of Chechnya and Dagestan, wanted to unite Circassia under Islam, and sent three Sufi naibs for this mission.

The first Naib was Haji-Mohammad (1842–1844) who reached Circassia in May 1842. By October he was accepted as leader by the Shapsugs and some of the Natukhajs. Next February he moved south to Ubykh country but failed because he started a civil war. In the spring of 1844 he was defeated by the Russians, withdrew into the mountains and died there in May.

The second naib was Suleiman Effendi (1845) who arrived among the Abadzeks in February 1845. His main goal was to rise a Circassian force and to lead it back to Chechnya, but the Circassians did not want to lose their best fighters. After twice failing to lead his recruits through the Russian lines he surrendered and gave the Russians key information in exchange for money.

Muhammad Amin era 
In 1848, an event took place that significantly influenced the history of the Caucasus and the general course of the Russo-Circassian War. Ambassadors came to Imam Shamil from the Abdzakh, one of the Circassian regions. They asked to be given a naib to be introduced to Islam properly and unite the peoples under the banner of the Imamate. Imam Shamil agreed to send Muhammad Amin in order to lead their struggle against the expansion of Russia. After learning that a warriorlike scholar has arrived, thousands of families moved to the Abdzakh region to accept his rule.

Calling himself "Naib", Muhammad Amin assumed full control over Circassia. His absolute rule was accepted by almost all Circassians. By the spring of 1849, the Abdzakh, Makhosh, Yegeruqway, and Chemguys declared their allegiance to the Naib; the Shapsugs along the Ubin River also promised support him with an alliance. The remaining small tribes had to power to resist him, and had to obey his orders.

In a short time, Naib succeeded in carrying out reforms in Circassia. He brought the Murtaziq units, previously used in Dagestan, to Circassia with a strategy of releasing prisoners of war in exchange for their conversion to Islam and loyalty.

Muhammad Amin disrupted the general strategy of the Circassians to stay on the defensive and directed 101 attacks against the Russian positions throughout 1849. The Russians, in turn, retaliated more severely against all Circassians.
The Russians, worried about Amin's rise strengthening Circassia, supported the opposition via arms supplies and financial support, as well as promises of high ranks as long as they topple Amin and submit Circassia to Russia. Despite the ongoing Russo-Circassian War, the opposition, mostly made up of nobles who lost their power, accepted these proposals. A significant part of the population, especially those who submitted recently, began to ignore the Naib's orders, causing the administrative system of Circassia to collapse.After the Crimean War started and the Ottomans joined the war against the Russians, Muhammad Amin took advantage of this to re-instate his rule. He managed to re-gain control in some parts of his former lands, and strengthened his rule further. On 9 October 1853, the Ottoman Sultan sent a letter to Imam Shamil and ordered him to declare a holy war against Russia. Muhammad Amin took it upon himself to lead the Circassian part of this holy war, and started mobilising against Russia. In 1853, Muhammad Amin gathered a Circassian army consisting of different tribes and planned an attack on Russian forts. Near Karachay territory, the Karachays attacked this Circassian army in order to stop this plan and promised full loyalty to Russia.
Meanwhile, the Ottoman Empire, who did not recognize Muhammad Amin as the ruler of Circassia, was preparing to send Seferbiy Zaneqo, a former Circassian commander in the Russo-Circassian War who had declared loyalty to the sultan, to lead Circassia instead. Muhammad Amin strictly disagreed with this decision and complained to the Ottoman Grand Vizier in a letter and asked the Ottomans to recognize him. Muhammad Amin's complaint was rejected, and Seferbiy was declared as a pasha, and the leader of Circassians.

Amin believed that the Ottomans were actually his enemies attempting to weaken his influence rather than assist him in any way. He went to Varna to declare his worries, and went to Istanbul to talk with the Sultan himself. The Sultan, on the condition that he becomes an Ottoman vassal, declared him a pasha as well.

This led to an even more complex situation, as the Ottomans now recognized two different rulers of Circassia. Each one boasted about his own recognition, resulting in rising tensions. In March 1855, near the river of Shebzh, the first battle between Muhammad Amin and Seferbiy Zaneqo took place. In May 1856 another battle took place on the banks of the Sup River. In January 1857, the followers of Amin and Zaneqo fought again near Tuapse, and both sides suffered casualties.

In May 1857, Muhammad Amin returned to Istanbul. He was then arrested at the request of the Russian ambassador and exiled to Damascus. In September 1857, he escaped and returned to Circassia. He made some final efforts to establish authority, but failed. Russian-backed opposition leaders managed to remove Amin from power. Naib's army, the Murtaziqs, tried to gain power, but were defeated by the Abdzakh opposition. The Russian military, making use of the turmoil, quickly annexed the Abdzakh region, but did not keep any of the promises given to the Abdzakh opposition leaders. After the annexation of the region, most Abdzakh Circassians were forced to a death march in the winter as part of the Circassian genocide.

Paris treaty of 1856 
In the Paris treaty of 1856, British representative Earl of Clarendon insisted that Circassia remain an independent state, but French and Russian representatives wanted to give Circassian lands to Russia. When Clarendon then tried to make the treaty state that Russia could not build forts in Circassia, he was again thwarted by the French representative. The final treaty also extended amnesty to nationals that had fought for enemy powers, but since Circassia had never previously been under Russian control, Circassians were exempt, and thus Circassians were now placed under de jure Russian sovereignty by the treaty, with Russia under no compulsion to grant Circassians the same rights as Russian citizens elsewhere.

End of the war 

In 1854, Circassian forces under the command of Gerandiqo Berzeg set out to re-capture areas and forts taken by the Russian army, and succeeded partly. In the Circassian congress convened in Abin in 1857, it was decided to "continue the war against the Russians and be killed, rather than surrender and be killed".

In February 1857, Polish volunteers under the command of Teofil Lapinski arrived in the Caucasus to fight for Circassia. At the same year in 1857, Dmitry Milyutin published the document in which he argued that the Circassian people should be exterminated. According to Milyutin, the issue was not to take over the Circassian lands, but to put an end to the Circassians. Rostislav Fadeyev supported the proposal, saying "It is not possible to tame the Circassians, if we destroy half of them completely, the other half will lay down their weapons". In May 1859, elders from the Bjedugh negotiated a peace with Russia and submitted to the Tsar. Other tribes soon submitted to the Russians, including the Abadzekhs on November 20, 1859. By 1860 the Russians had seventy thousand soldiers in Circassia.

According to Ivan Drozdov, for the most part, the Russian army preferred to indiscriminately destroy areas where Circassians resided. In September 1862, after attacking a Circassian village and seeing some of its inhabitants flee into the forest, General Yevdokimov bombarded that forest for six hours straight and ordered his men to kill every living thing, he then set the forest on fire to make sure no survivors are left. Drozdov reported to have overheard Circassian men taking vows to sacrifice themselves to the cannons to allow their family and rest of their villages to escape, and later more reports of groups of Circassians doing so were received.

With the operation launched from the autumn of 1863, the Circassian villages and their supplies were to be burned, and this process was repeated until General Yevdokimov was convinced that all inhabitants of the region had died.

The remaining Circassians established an the Circassian Parliament in the capital city of Ş̂açə (Sochi) on 25 June 1861. Gerandiqo Berzeg was appointed as the head of the parliament. This parliament asked for help from Europe, arguing that they would be forced into exile soon.

The Circassian Parliament negotiated with the Russian Tsar Alexander II in September 1861 to establish peace, expressing their readiness to accept Russian citizenship.

After being convinced by his generals, the Russian Tsar declared that Circassia will not only be annexed to Russia unconditionally, but the Circassians will leave, and if the Circassian people do not accept forcefully migrating to Turkey, the Russian generals will see no problem in killing all Circassians. He gave the Circassian representatives a month to decide. Soon after, Russian General Kolyobakin invaded Sochi and destroyed the parliament and no other government publicly opposed this.

On April 9, 1864, "A Petition from Circassian leaders to Her Majesty Queen Victoria" was signed by the Circassians. The document requests British military aid, or at the worst case, humanitarian aid, to the Circassian people. It reads:

In March 1864, a surrounded Circassian army refused to surrender and committed mass suicide. Around the same time, a final battle took place in Qbaada in 1864 between the Circassian army of 20,000 men and women, consisting of local villagers and militia as well as tribal horsemen and a Russian army of 100,000 men, consisting of Cossack and Russian horsemen, infantry and artillery. The Russian forces advanced from four sides. Circassian forces tried to break the line, but many were hit by Russian artillery and infantry before they managed to reach the front. The remaining fighters continued to fight as militants and were soon defeated. The Russian army began celebrating victory on the corpses, and a military-religious parade was held, as 100 Circassian warriors were publicly mutilated in a public execution in order to establish authority.

The Russian army began raiding and burning Circassian villages, destroying fields to prevent return, cutting down trees, and driving the people to the Black Sea coast, the soldiers used many methods to kill or terrorize the Cirassian people.
After 101 years of resistance, all of Circassia fell into Russian hands. The only exception, the Hakuchey, who lived in the mountainous regions, continued their resistance until the 1870s.

Expulsion and genocide

The Circassian genocide was the Russian Empire's systematic mass murder, ethnic cleansing, forced migration, and expulsion of 800,000–1,500,000 Circassians (at least 75% of the total population) from their homeland Circassia, which roughly encompassed the major part of the North Caucasus and the northeast shore of the Black Sea.

After the war, Russian General Yevdokimov was tasked with forcing the surviving Circassian inhabitants to relocate outside of the region, primarily in the Ottoman Empire. This policy was enforced by mobile columns of Russian riflemen and Cossack cavalry.

Ottoman archives show nearly 1 million migrants entering their land from the Caucasus by 1879, with nearly half of them dying on the shores as a result of diseases. If Ottoman archives are correct, it would make it the biggest exile of the 19th century, and indeed, in support of the Ottoman archives, the Russian census of 1897 records only 150,000 Circassians, one tenth of the original number, still remaining in the now conquered region.

90% of people with Circassian descent now live in other countries, primarily in Turkey, Jordan and other countries of the Middle East, with only 500,000–700,000 remaining in what is now Russia. The depopulated Circassian lands were resettled by numerous ethnic groups, including Russians, Ukrainians and Georgians.

See also
 Caucasian War
 Russian conquest of Chechnya and Dagestan
 Mission of the Vixen
 David Urquhart

Notes

Citations and notes

Sources

More References
 Henze, Paul B. 1992. "Circassian resistance to Russia." In Marie Bennigsen Broxup, ed., The North Caucasus Barrier: The Russian Advance Towards The Muslim World. London: C Hurst & Co, 266 pp. (Also New York: St. Martin's Press, 252 pp.) Part of it can be found here. Retrieved 11 March 2007.
 
 Tsutsiev, Arthur, Atlas of the Ethno-Political History of the Caucasus, 2014

Further reading
 
 Goble, Paul. 2005. Circassians demand Russian apology for 19th century genocide. Radio Free Europe / Radio Liberty, 15 July 2005, 8(23).
 Karpat, Kemal H. 1985. Ottoman Population, 1830–1914: Demographic and Social Characteristics. Madison, Wis.: University of Wisconsin Press.
 Levene, Mark. 2005. Genocide in the Age of the Nation State. London; New York: I.B. Tauris.
 King, Charles. 2008. The Ghost of Freedom: A History of the Caucasus. Oxford Univ. Press.
 Mackie, J[ohn] Milton. 1856. Life of Schamyl: and narrative of the Circassian War of independence against Russia. 
 McCarthy, Justin. 1995. Death and Exile: The Ethnic Cleansing of Ottoman Muslims, 1821–1922. Princeton, New Jersey: Darwin. Chapter 2: Eastern Anatolia and the Caucasus.
 Neumann, Karl Friedrich. 1840. Russland und die Tscherkessen. Stuttgart und Tübingen: J. G. Cotta. In PDF through Internet Archive
 Shenfield, Stephen D. 1999. The Circassians: a forgotten genocide?. In Levene, Mark and Penny Roberts, eds., The massacre in history. Oxford and New York: Berghahn Books. Series: War and Genocide; 1. 149–162.
 Unrepresented Nations and People Organisation (UNPO). 2004. The Circassian Genocide, 2004-12-14.
 Ibid. 2006. Circassia: Adygs Ask European Parliament to Recognize Genocide, 2006-10-16.
 Journal of a residence in Circassia during the years 1837, 1838, and 1839 – Bell, James Stanislaus (English)
 The Annual Register. 1836. United Kingdom
 Butkov, P.G. 1869. Materials for New History of the Caucasus 1722–1803.
 Jaimoukha, A., The Circassians: A Handbook, London: RoutledgeCurzon; New York; Routledge and Palgrave, 2001.
 Khodarkovsky, Michael. 2002. Russia's Steppe Frontier: The Making of a Colonial Empire, 1500–1800. Bloomington: Indiana University Press. Series: Indiana-Michigan series in Russian and East European studies.
 Leitzinger, Antero. 2000. The Circassian Genocide. In The Eurasian Politician, 2000 October 2000, Issue 2.
 Richmond, Walter. The Circassian Genocide, Rutgers University Press, 2013. 
 Shapi Kaziev. Kaziev, Shapi. Imam Shamil. "Molodaya Gvardiya" publishers. Moscow, 2001, 2003, 2006, 2010

External links
 Abzakh, Edris. 1996. Circassian History.
 Adanır, Fikret. 2007. Course syllabus with useful reading list.
 Hatk, Isam. 1992. Russian–Circassian War, 1763 – 21 May 1864. Al-Waha-Oasis, 1992, 51:10–15. Amman.
 Köremezli İbrahim. 2004. The Place of the Ottoman Empire in the Russo-Circassian War (1830–1864). Unpublished M.A. Thesis, Bilkent University, Ankara, Turkey.
 A collection of cited reports on the conflict, collected by the Circassian World, translated by Nejan Huvaj, and found on this page. Retrieved 11 March 2007

18th-century conflicts
19th-century conflicts
18th-century military history of the Russian Empire
19th-century military history of the Russian Empire
1763 in the Russian Empire
1864 in the Russian Empire
Caucasian War
Wars involving Chechnya
Wars involving Russia
Wars involving the Circassians
Alexander II of Russia